Kərimbəyli (also, Kerimbeyli and Karimbayli) is a village and municipality in the Sharur District of Nakhchivan Autonomous Republic, Azerbaijan. It is located 9 km in the north-west from the district center, on the bank of the Araz River. Its population is busy with farming and animal husbandry. There are secondary school, library, club and a medical center in the village. It has a population of 1,744.

Etymology
The settlement was founded as a result of settlement of the kərimbəyli (karimbayli) tribe, one of the arms of the qazaxlı (gazakhly) tribal unity.

References 

Populated places in Sharur District